Radhi Shenaishil Swadi (born 11 August 1969) is a former Iraqi footballer and former coach of the Iraq national football team, and currently manages Iraq U23.

Playing career 
Radhi Shenaishil was born and brought up in Al-Thawra City in Baghdad.

He captained an Iraqi Under 20s team and helped them to top their group which included Spain, Norway and Argentina, who they beat 1–0 with Radhi scoring the winner from a penalty against a side featuring Diego Simeone and Roberto Bonano in the FIFA World Youth Championship in Saudi Arabia in 1989.

The libero was voted into the Asian Cup select team XI at the 1996 Asian Cup with teammate Laith Hussein after helping Iraq to the quarter-finals.

In the summer of 1999, he retired from international football after the Pan-Arab Games final loss against hosts Jordan on penalties, where he scored Iraq's only penalty in a 3–1 shoot-out loss. In the same game he also scored an own-goal.

International goals
Scores and results list Iraq's goal tally first.

Managerial career 
In March 2009,  Shenaishil managed the Iraq national team for two friendly matches, against Saudi Arabia and South Korea. On 11 September 2014, Shenaishil was appointed as manager of Qatar Stars League club Qatar SC.

Months before the 2015 AFC Asian Cup started, Shenaishil was named as new Iraqi national team manager, replacing Hakeem Shaker whilst continuing as manager of Qatar SC. The first match under Shenaishil as Iraq coach was a 1–1 draw with Kuwait. He led the team in tournament to a 1–0 win over Jordan in opener and a 2–0 win over Palestine and also a 0–1 loss to Japan and finished as group runner-up behind Japan with six points. His side faced Iran in quarter-final and won 7–6 in penalties after 3–3 draw in extra time. In semi-finals, Iraq lost 0–2 to South Korea and then lost the third place match 3–2 to UAE. He returned to Qatar SC in February 2015, after the Asian Cup ended, but resigned on 26 October 2015.

On 15 April 2016, Shenaishil became the new coach of Iraq. in order to lead the team in the 2018 FIFA World Cup qualification – AFC Third Round. The team did not perform and after losing five out of seven games, he was sacked on April 10, 2017.

On 12 December 2018, Shenaishil became the new coach for Naft Al-Wasat SC, a big announcement for him to come back to the Iraqi league.

On 26 July 2022, Shenaishil was announced as the new head coach for Iraq U23, after serving as an interim coach of the Iraqi national team.

Managerial statistics

Honours

As a player
Club
Iraqi Premier League
 Winner Al-Zawra'a SC 1990-1991
1991–92 Iraqi League with Al-Quwa Al-JawiyaIraq FA Cup 1 *** 92
Iraq FA Cup 
 Winner 5 times 
  81, 82, 89 , 90 , 91 with Al-Zawra'a SC
 92 with Al-Quwa Al-Jawiya
Al-Intisar Cup Winners
 Winner 2 times 
 84, 86 with Al-Zawra'a SC
Arab Cooperation Council Championship Winners
Winner Once
1989 
Qatar Emir Cup
Winner 5 times 
 95, 96, 97, 98 with Al-Ittihad
 2000 with Al Sadd SC
Qatari League 
Winner Three Times 
 1997/1998 with Al-Ittihad
 1999/2000 With Al Sadd Sc
 2002/2003 with Qatar SC
Sheikh Jassim Cup
Winner 3 times 
 2000 With Al Sadd SC 
 2002,2004 with Qatar SC

As a manager

Club
Al-Zawraa
Iraqi Premier League: 2010–11

International
Iraq
 AFC Asian Cup fourth-place: 2015

References

External links
 Profile on Goalzz.com

Living people
Iraqi footballers
Iraqi expatriate footballers
Iraqi football managers
Iraqi expatriate football managers
Qatar SC managers
Sportspeople from Baghdad
Al-Quwa Al-Jawiya players
Qatar SC players
Al-Zawraa SC players
Al Sadd SC players
Sharjah FC players
Al-Gharafa SC players
Al-Shorta SC managers
Expatriate football managers in Qatar
Olympic footballers of Iraq
Footballers at the 1988 Summer Olympics
1996 AFC Asian Cup players
2015 AFC Asian Cup managers
Qatar Stars League players
UAE Pro League players
1969 births
Association football defenders
Al-Zawraa SC managers
Al-Quwa Al-Jawiya managers
Al-Talaba SC managers
Iraq international footballers
Expatriate footballers in Qatar
Expatriate footballers in the United Arab Emirates
Iraqi expatriate sportspeople in Qatar
Iraqi expatriate sportspeople in the United Arab Emirates